This is a list of television programmes that are either currently being broadcast or have previously been broadcast on CaribVision through their media centre in Barbados.

Normal Programming 


A
 Another Accent - journalistic
 Another Flavour - cuisine

B
 Book Talk - talk

C
 Carib Beer Highlights - sports
 Caribbean Cuisine - cuisine
 Caribbean News Review - news and current affairs
 Caribbean Newsline - news and current affairs
 Caribbean Passport - journalistic
 Caribbean Today - news and current affairs
 CaribScope Travel and Leisure - journalistic
 Chat Room - talk

D
 Di Show - entertainment
Dolor Factor Live (with Delia Dolor) — talk show

E
 E-Zone - entertainment

F
Faith & Truth - religion

H
 Head On - talk
 Hill & Gully Ride - journalistic
 The Hit List - entertainment

I
 Island Jams - entertainment
 Island Life Destinations - journalistic
 The Investor - talk

K
 KiddieCrew.com - children and educational
 Kid's Club - children and educational

M
 The Molly Show - children and educational

O
 On a Personal Note - talk
 On Stage - entertainment

P
 Paradise Motor Sports - sports
 Pet Playhouse - children and educational
 Pilly Out Front - entertainment
 Primetime Caribbean - news and current affairs
 Profile - talk

R
 Riddim Express - entertainment

S
 Sancoche - cuisine
 Sarge in Charge - drama
 Sports Locker - sports

T
 Talk Caribbean - talk

V
 Vibes Caribbean - journalistic
 VIP Backstage - entertainment

W
 Westwood Park - drama
 Women West Indies - journalistic

Y
 Yellow Umbrella - children and educational

See also 
CaribVision

Caribbean Media Corporation
CaribVision